The 2015–16 Mercer Bears men's basketball team represented Mercer University during the 2015–16 NCAA Division I men's basketball season. The Bears, led by eighth year head coach Bob Hoffman, played their home games at Hawkins Arena on the university's Macon, Georgia campus and were second year members of the Southern Conference. They finished the season 19–15, 8–10 in SoCon play to finish in seventh place. They defeated The Citadel in the first round of the SoCon tournament to advance to the quarterfinals where they lost to East Tennessee State. They were invited to the CollegeInsider.com Tournament where they lost in the first round to Coastal Carolina.

Murder of Jibri Bryan
Jibri Bryan, a sixth-year senior, was shot and killed on February 2, 2016. He was found with a gunshot wound to the head in the driver's seat of a Chevy Monte Carlo parked in a convenience store in Macon, Georgia. Bryan played in six games in the 2015–16 season due to a knee injury, averaging 7.8 points per game. Jarvis Clinton Miller has been charged in the murder of Bryan after attempting to flee from the crime scene. In a statement, Mercer coach Bob Hoffman said, "Jibri Bryan was a special young man who was a great contributor to our team and did everything that was asked of him.

Roster

Schedule

 
|-
! colspan="9" style="background:#e87511; color:#000;"| Regular season

|-
! colspan="9" style="background:#e87511; color:#000;"| SoCon tournament

|-
! colspan="9" style="background:#e87511; color:#000;"| CIT

References

Mercer Bears men's basketball seasons
Mercer
Mercer
Mercer Bears
Mercer Bears